Alexander Macaulay (23 September 1927 – 2006) was a Scottish footballer who played as an inside right in the Scottish League for Queen's Park and Dunfermline Athletic. He was capped by Scotland at amateur level.

References 

1927 births
2006 deaths
Scottish footballers
Scottish Football League players
Queen's Park F.C. players
Association football inside forwards
Scotland amateur international footballers
People from Gorbals
Dunfermline Athletic F.C. players
East Fife F.C. players
Edinburgh University A.F.C. players